"Getting Married Today" is a patter song from the musical Company (1970) with music and lyrics by Stephen Sondheim. It is sung by the manic Amy, as the thought of marriage sends her into a panic on the day of her wedding. It is often incorrectly referred to as "Not Getting Married Today." The song has been described as one of the most difficult songs to perform in musical theatre, with one verse containing 68 words to be sung in roughly 11 seconds; one expert says that successful performance “depends on clear diction, implicit pitch accuracy and breath support alongside imperative comedic timing.”

The Evening Standard cited Jonathan Bailey in Marianne Elliot's 2018 gender-swapped West End production, and Katie Finneran in a 2011 New York Philharmonic concert version as stand out performances.

Production
"Getting Married Today" was conceived as "Sondheim's psychotic notion of a patter song" to simulate the sensation of having a mental breakdown through verbal diarrhea and constantly changing the subject mid-sentence.

Stephen Sondheim gave a masterclass on some of his songs, including this one, at London's Guildhall School.

The song features operatic interludes described by Edge Boston as "soprano intermezzos", sung by a priest who comically comments on the bride's breakdown and extols the glory of marriage.

Lyrical content

In her meltdown, Amy discusses the very nature of a wedding, and how it is not relevant to a modern society:

Wedding, what's a wedding? It's a prehistoric ritual where
Everybody promises fidelity forever, which is
Maybe the most horrifying word I ever heard, and which is
Followed by a honeymoon, where suddenly he'll realize he's
Saddled with a nut and wanna kill me which he should.

Critical reception
It has been described as "one of Sondheim's toughest songs". Journal Sentinel said the song captures "both the crazed humor and darker undertow within this manic bride". White Rhino Report wrote "Amy's frenetic rant about not being ready for marriage is a rapid-fire patter song.  Set off against this insanity is the ironic counterpoint of Jenny's operatic aria about the beauty of a wedding day." Commenting on Stephen Sondheim's 'Company' With The New York Philharmonic, The AV Club wrote "it'd be hard for anyone to sing the patter-iffic 'Getting Married Today' as fast as it's meant to be, even with months to work on it". Chichester Observer said Amy is a "jittery bride-to-be" with an "epic breakdown and breakneck teeth-rattling delivery".

The Guardian wrote the show "boasts the most astonishing score of any Stephen Sondheim work, and at the same time a book demonstrating an almost complete lack of commitment to coherent narrative", adding that the show has a "large dollop of irony". It continued by saying: "The result is numbers, such as 'The Little Things You Do Together' and 'Getting Married Today', that are sheer bliss to listen to, but often unexpectedly disappointing and distancing in performance."

Performances

 Jonathan Bailey originated the gender-swapped role of Jamie who performed the song in Marianne Elliott's 2018 West End revival. Bailey, "whose lightning-fast, show-stopping rendition of the song became a must-see West End event" according to Variety, won him the Laurence Olivier Award for Best Actor in a Supporting Role in a Musical in 2019.
 The song was covered in a Glee episode where Emma Pillsbury starts to second-guess marrying Will Schuester, before fleeing from the wedding. 
 The song was also covered in a performance in the 2019 Broadway Backwards charity event in which Darren Criss sang the role of "Amy".

References

1970 songs
Patter songs
Songs from musicals
Songs written by Stephen Sondheim
Songs about marriage